Kevin Patrick Dawson (born 30 June 1990) is an Irish footballer who plays as a midfielder for Torquay United on loan from Gloucester City.

Career

Sporting Fingal
Following his schoolboy years at St Malachys FC and both Belvedere and St. Kevin's Boys, Dublin-born Dawson joined Sporting Fingal in 2009. Initially part of their Under–20 squad, Dawson forced his way into Fingal's first team picture making 4 appearances during the 2009 First Division season. Dawson won an FAI Cup winners medal in 2009 as an unused substitute during Sporting's Fingal's 2–1 victory over Sligo Rovers. Following Sporting Fingal's promotion to the Premier Division for 2010, the young midfielder made a further 16 league and cup appearances and won a 2010 A Championship Cup medal as part of their reserve side. Ahead of the 2011 season, Dawson was still under contract at Sporting Fingal but following the pre-season demise of the club Dawson was left without a club.

Shelbourne
On 14 February 2011, Dawson was snapped up Shelbourne for their 2011 First Division campaign. He became more of a permanent fixture halfway through the season where he helped Shels gain promotion to the Premier League. He received praise for his performance in the 2011 FAI Cup Final against Sligo Rovers. Shelbourne would eventually lose on penalties, Dawson being one of the players to miss from the spot.

Yeovil Town
Dawson signed for English League One side Yeovil Town following the expiry of his Shelbourne contract upon the opening of the 2013 January transfer window, signing a contract until the end of the 2012–13 season. On 8 January 2013, Dawson made his Yeovil debut as a substitute in their Football League Trophy area semi-final defeat against Leyton Orient. On 19 May 2013, Dawson played in the 2013 League One play-off final as Yeovil beat Brentford 2–1 to secure promotion to the Football League Championship. On 26 June 2013, Dawson signed a two-year contract extension.

Cheltenham Town
On 17 May 2017, Dawson rejected the offer of a new contract at Yeovil, and signed for fellow League Two side Cheltenham Town on a two-year deal.

Forest Green Rovers
On 1 July 2019, Dawson rejected the offer of a new contract from Cheltenham Town to sign for League Two rivals Forest Green Rovers on an initial one-year deal. At the end of the 2019–20 season, Dawson was released by Forest Green Rovers.

Gloucester City

On 10 September 2020, Dawson signed for National League North club Gloucester City.

Torquay United

On 4 March 2023, Dawson joined Torquay United on loan for the remainder of the season.

Personal life
His eldest brother Stephen has played in the English Football League for Mansfield Town, Bury, Leyton Orient, Barnsley, Rochdale and Scunthorpe United.

Another brother Brendan played youth football for Shamrock Rovers and made one first team substitute appearance for Rovers in 2005.

Career statistics

Honours
Sporting Fingal
FAI Cup: 2009

Yeovil Town
Football League One play-offs: 2012–13

References

External links
 

1990 births
Living people
Association footballers from Dublin (city)
Republic of Ireland association footballers
Republic of Ireland youth international footballers
Association football midfielders
League of Ireland players
English Football League players
Sporting Fingal F.C. players
Shelbourne F.C. players
Yeovil Town F.C. players
Cheltenham Town F.C. players
Belvedere F.C. players
Forest Green Rovers F.C. players
Gloucester City A.F.C. players
Torquay United F.C. players
National League (English football) players